Junius often refers to:
 Junius (writer), the pseudonym of an 18th-century British political writer of strongly Whig principles
 The nomen of the ancient Roman 
 Rosa Luxemburg's Junius Pamphlet, a nickname for a pamphlet Luxemburg wrote in prison in 1915 

Junius may also refer to:

Surname
 Franciscus Junius (the elder) (1545–1602), Huguenot theologian
 Franciscus Junius (the younger) (1591–1677), Germanic philologist
 Hadrianus Junius (1511–1575), also known as Adriaen de Jonghe, Dutch humanist
 Johannes Junius (1573–1628), mayor of Bamberg, and a victim of the Bamberg witch trials
 Robert Junius (1606–1665), Dutch Reformed Church missionary to Taiwan

Given name
 Junius Bassus (fl. 318–331), ancient Roman politician
 Junius Bassus Theotecnius (317–359), Roman politician, son of Junius Bassus
 Junius Bibbs (1910–1980), American baseball infielder in the Negro leagues
 Junius Bird (1907–1982), American archaeologist and curator; possible inspiration for the character Indiana Jones
 Junius Blaesus (died 31), Roman army commander and proconsul of Africa
 Junius Brutus Booth (1796–1852), English actor and father of Abraham Lincoln assassin John Wilkes Booth
 Junius Brutus Booth, Jr. (1821–1883), American actor and theatre manager; son of Junius Booth
 Junius Henri Browne (1833-1902), American journalist and Civil War correspondent
 Junius Daniel (1828–1864), American planter and career military officer; Confederate brigadier general in the American Civil War
 Junius Kaʻae (1845–1906), Hawaiian politician
 Junius Marion Futrell (1870–1955), 30th governor of Arkansas
 Junius Hillyer (1807–1886), American lawyer, judge and politician and two-time member of the US House of Representatives from Georgia
 Junius Ho (born 1962), Hong Kong lawyer
 Junius Richard Jayewardene (1906–1996), President of Sri Lanka
 Junius J. Johnson (died 1898), American miner who played a significant role in the Cripple Creek miners' strike of 1894
 Junius Kellogg (1927–1998), American basketball player and member of the Harlem Globetrotters
 Junius Spencer Morgan (1813–1890), American banker and financier, and father of financier J.P. Morgan, Sr.
 Junius Spencer Morgan II (1867–1932), art collector and cousin of J.P. Morgan, Sr.
 Junius Spencer Morgan III (1892–1960), American banker
 Junius Philargyrius, early commentator of the 5th, 6th or 7th century
 Junius Rusticus (c. 100 – c. 170), Stoic philosopher and one of the teachers of Marcus Aurelius
 Junius Scales (1920–2002), a leader of the Communist Party of the United States of America
 Junius Myer Schine (1890–1971), New York theater and hotel magnate
 Junius Rogers (1999-), American rapper and songwriter

Places
 Junius, New York, a town
 Junius, South Dakota, an unincorporated community 
 Hughes River (West Virginia), also known historically as the Junius River

Other uses
 Junius (band), an American rock band
 Junius (album)
 Junius (horse)